The 2006 Nicky Rackard Cup was the 2006 campaign of the Nicky Rackard Cup and began on Saturday June 10, 2006.  2006 was the second time this new element of the All-Ireland Senior Hurling Championship was introduced.  It was devised by the Hurling Development Committee to encourage some of the weaker hurling counties and to give them the chance of playing more games. The final will be played on Sunday, August 13 in Croke Park, Dublin City.

Donegal, Armagh, Longford and Derry played in the semi-finals. Longford qualified by defeating the other two group runners-up. 
After winning their semi-finals, Donegal and Derry contested the final in Croke Park on August 12. Derry won easily and were promoted to the 2007 Christy Ring Cup.

Format

Twelve teams participate in the 2006 Nicky Rackard Cup.  The teams were divided into three groups of four roughly based on geographical criteria. The groups are identical to the Nicky Rackard Cup 2005 except that in 3C Derry replace London, who have been promoted.

Group 3A: Sligo, Tyrone, Donegal and Fermanagh
Group 3B: Louth, Cavan, Armagh and Leitrim
Group 3C: Derry, Warwickshire, Longford and Monaghan

Group 3A

Group 3B

Group 3C

Quarter-finals

Semi-finals

Final 

Nicky Rackard Cup
Nicky Rackard Cup